Sandy Valley High School is a public high school near Magnolia, Ohio, United States. It is the only high school in the Sandy Valley Local Schools district. Its mascot is a cardinal and its colors are red and gray. A new high school building opened January 20, 2009.

Academics
Sandy Valley currently offers 7 Advanced Placement (AP) courses: AP Literature and Composition, AP Calculus AB, AP Biology, AP Spanish Language, AP Government, and AP Modern American History.

Athletics
Sandy Valley offers 8 boys and 8 girls sports in the Inter Valley Conference, including:
Boys Football     Division IV
Girls Volleyball    Division III
Boys and Girls Cross Country     Division III (Both)
Boys and Girls Golf     Division II (Boys)     Division I (Girls)
Boys Wrestling     Division III
Girls Gymnastics     Division I
Boys and Girls Basketball     Division III (Both)
Boys and Girls Bowling     Division I (Both)
Boys Baseball     Division III
Girls Softball     Division III
Boys and Girls Track and Field     Division II (Both)

External links
 District Website

High schools in Tuscarawas County, Ohio
Public high schools in Ohio